James Bell Connolly (21 January 1892 – 14 September 1970) was an Australian politician.

He was born in Newtown, Tasmania. In 1948 he was elected to the Tasmanian Legislative Council as the Labor member for Buckingham. He served until his retirement in 1968.

References

1892 births
1970 deaths
Members of the Tasmanian Legislative Council
Australian Labor Party members of the Parliament of Tasmania
20th-century Australian politicians